The World Covered Court Championships were part of a series of three major world championships sanctioned from 1913 to 1923 by the International Lawn Tennis Federation (ILTF). The tournament was played indoors on wood floors, and its venue changed from year to year among several countries. While the World Grass Court Championships (Wimbledon) and World Hard Court Championships (WHCC) could justify their "world championship" titles, the WCCC had trouble attracting top players from outside Europe. At an Annual General Meeting (AGM) held on 16 March 1923 in Paris, France the ILTF issued the ‘Rules of Tennis’ that were adopted with public effect on 1 January 1924. USA became an affiliated member of the ILTF. The World Championship title was also dropped at this meeting and a new category of Official Championship was created for events in Great Britain, France, USA and Australia – today’s Grand Slam events. The WCCC tournament was then disbanded by the ILTF.
.

Tournament information

Champions

Men's singles

Women's singles

Men's doubles

Women's doubles

Mixed doubles

See also
 World Hard Court Championships
 World Grass Court Championships (Wimbledon)

References

Major tennis tournaments
Indoor tennis tournaments
Wood court tennis tournaments
Defunct tennis tournaments in Europe